Conny Persson (born 13 January 1968, in Höör) is a Swedish former sport shooter who competed in the 2000 Summer Olympics.

References

1968 births
Living people
Swedish male sport shooters
Trap and double trap shooters
Olympic shooters of Sweden
Shooters at the 2000 Summer Olympics